Higley was born in Simsbury, Connecticut and for two years attended the Collegiate School, later Yale University. Afterwards he became a teacher and pupil of Dr. Thomas Hooker, physician, and eventually was granted license to practice as a medical doctor. He was also a practicing blacksmith, to whom in 1728 the Connecticut General Court granted exclusive rights for making steel for a period of 10 years. Upon the death of his father, Higley inherited land near Simsbury, known as Copper Hill, which he augmented by purchase of 143 acres. Here about 1730 he settled. By early 1733, Higley had begun mining copper on his own property.

The first so-called "Higley coppers" (Trader's Currency Token of the Colony of Connecticut) bear the date 1737. Although there is no firm evidence that links Higley to coin minting, since colonial times he has been associated with these Connecticut tokens. Certainly he had the copper necessary, as well as the skill to make steel dies. Of the 1737 coppers, four varieties have an obverse with legend THE VALUE OF THREE PENCE and roman numeral III. A listing of Higley coppers by Daniel Freidus lists 15 varieties in total, from 8 obverse and 5 reverse dies. Since most Higley Coppers are double struck, researchers believe that the hammer method rather than a screw press was used to make them. The sizes of these coins varied, but they were approximately the size of a modern half-dollar.

References 
 "Samuel Higley, an early American metallurgist", Frederick H. Getman, J. Chem. Educ., 1941, 18 (10), October 1941, p 453. DOI: 10.1021/ed018p453.
 "Samuel Higley, M.D.", Roy J. Popkin, M.D., N Engl J Med 1964, 271:310-311, August 6, 1964. DOI: 10.1056/NEJM196408062710611.
 "Numismatics" by Russ MacKendrick, New York Times, May 22, 1977, page 102. 
 "The History and Die Varieties of the Higley Coppers", Breen, pp. 39-40; Crosby, pp. 324-7; Daniel Freidus, in The Token: America's Other Money, ed. by Richard G. Doty, Coinage of the Americas Conference, October 29, 1994, New York: American Numismatic Society, 1-17.
 "Known Varieties of the Higley Coppers," Michael Hodder, The American Numismatic Association Centennial Anthology, ed. Carl W.A. Carlson and Michael Hodder (Wolfeboro, NH: Bowers and Merena, 1991), p. 6.
 The Higley Copper and Copper Mining in Connecticut, John Carter, Geology.com
 Samuel Higley Mined and Minted America's First Coins: The Higley Copper was the first coin minted in America, by Ken Kuhl, Patch.com, April 17, 2011
 Higley Coppers 1737, 1739: Introduction
 US Rare Coin Investments - 1737 Higley Copper 3P

1687 births
1737 deaths
American metallurgists